René Guyot (born 1881) was a Belgian sport shooter who competed in the late 19th century and early 20th century in trap shooting. He participated in Shooting at the 1900 Summer Olympics in Paris and won the silver medal in the trap competition.

References

External links
 

Belgian male sport shooters
Olympic silver medalists for Belgium
Olympic shooters of Belgium
Shooters at the 1900 Summer Olympics
1881 births
Year of death missing
Place of birth missing
Olympic medalists in shooting
Medalists at the 1900 Summer Olympics
Place of death missing
Date of birth missing